Lost Creek is a stream in Audrain and Montgomery counties the U.S. state of Missouri. It is a tributary of the Cuivre River.

Lost Creek was so named on account of its irregular course.

See also
List of rivers of Missouri

References

Rivers of Audrain County, Missouri
Rivers of Montgomery County, Missouri
Rivers of Missouri